The Dallara GP3/16 was the third generation of car developed by Italian manufacturer Dallara to run as the sole chassis for the GP3 Series, a feeder series for Formula One and the FIA Formula 2 Championship. The GP3/16 made its debut at the start of the 2016 season in Barcelona, and remained in use until the final season of the GP3 Series in 2018.

History
The Dallara GP3/16 chassis was designed to replace the GP3/13 chassis in the 2016 season. Dallara began the development, design and construction of the GP3/16 chassis in mid-2014. The first chassis began assembly in July 2015, and was completed in September.

Design

Chassis
The Dallara GP3/16 car has a more radical design with the all-new F1-style lower nose, original rear wing, air ventilation in both sidepods and also engine cover. The "shark fin" engine cover was replaced by a more conventional design. The rear wing of all Dallara GP3/16 cars were slightly updated for the 2017 season due to the introduction of the Drag Reduction System (DRS) used in Formula One and Formula 2.

Engine package
The GP3/16 used a 3.4 L (207 cu in) V6 naturally-aspirated direct-injected fuel-efficient engine developed by Mecachrome Motorsport, replacing the P57 engine developed by Advanced Engine Research (AER) that was used in its predecessor, the GP3/13.

Aerodynamics
The Dallara GP3/16 car would incorporate the Drag Reduction Systems (DRS) rear wing flap for the first time since 2017 season in a purpose for overtaking maneuver assist.

References

External links

FIA Formula 2 Championship official website
FIA Formula 2 The Car & Engine Guide
GP3 Series on dallara.it

GP3 Series
Open wheel racing cars
GP3 16
GP3 Series cars